Capo dell'Arma Lighthouse is an active lighthouse in northwestern Italy. It is located on a cape near the village of Bussana in the comune of Sanremo, in the province of Imperia. It is the first lighthouse on the Ligurian coast, starting from the French border.

History
The original structure was built by the Civil Engineers in 1912 and was activated by the Regia Marina to illuminate this part of the sea border. It was electrified in 1936. During World War II the original structure was completely destroyed by German retreating troops, but was quickly rebuilt by the Navy and the project was completed in 1948.

The lighthouse is completely controlled and operated by the Command Area Lighthouses Navy based in La Spezia, which incidentally takes care of all the lighthouses in the Tyrrhenian Sea. The Marina Militare is responsible for managing all the lights on an approximate 8000 kilometers of Italian coastline since 1910, using both military and civilian technicians.

See also
List of lighthouses in Italy

References

External links

 Servizio Fari Marina Militare 
  Faro di Han 

Lighthouses in Italy
Sanremo
Lighthouses completed in 1912
Lighthouses completed in 1948
Buildings and structures in Liguria
1912 establishments in Italy